The Australia men's national cricket team represents Australia in men's international cricket. As the joint oldest team in Test cricket history, playing in the first ever Test match in 1877, the team also plays One-Day International (ODI) and Twenty20 International (T20I) cricket, participating in both the first ODI, against England in the 1970–71 season and the first T20I, against New Zealand in the 2004–05 season, winning both games. The team draws its players from teams playing in the Australian domestic competitions – the Sheffield Shield, the Australian domestic limited-overs cricket tournament and the Big Bash League.

The national team has played 853 Test matches, winning 405, losing 229, drawing 217 and tying 2. , Australia is ranked first in the ICC Test Championship on 128 rating points. Australia is the most successful team in Test cricket history, in terms of overall wins, win–loss ratio and wins percentage.

Test rivalries include The Ashes (with England), the Border–Gavaskar Trophy (with India), the Frank Worrell Trophy (with the West Indies), the Trans-Tasman Trophy (with New Zealand), and with South Africa.

The team has played 977 ODI matches, winning 593, losing 341, tying 9 and with 34 ending in a no-result. , Australia is ranked third in the ICC ODI Championship on 107 rating points, though have been ranked first for 141 of 185 months since its introduction in 2002. Australia is the most successful team in ODI cricket history, winning more than 60 per cent of their matches, with a record seven World Cup final appearances (1975, 1987, 1996, 1999, 2003, 2007 and 2015) and have won the World Cup a record five times: 1987, 1999, 2003, 2007 and 2015. Australia is the first (and only) team to appear in four consecutive World Cup finals (1996, 1999, 2003 and 2007), surpassing the old record of three consecutive World Cup appearances by the West Indies (1975, 1979 and 1983) and the first and only team to win 3 consecutive World Cups (1999, 2003 and 2007). The team was undefeated in 34 consecutive World Cup matches until the 2011 Cricket World Cup where Pakistan beat them by 4 wickets in the Group stage. It is also the second team to win a World Cup (2015) on home soil, after India (2011). Australia have also won the ICC Champions Trophy twice (2006 and 2009) making them the first and the only team to become back to back winners in the Champions Trophy tournaments. As of 2021, Australia is the only team to win five Cricket World Cups; no other team has won more than two.

The national team has played 174 Twenty20 International matches, winning 91, losing 76, tying 3 and with 4 ending in a no-result. , Australia is ranked fifth in the ICC T20I Championship on 251 rating points. Australia have won the ICC Men's T20 World Cup once, defeating New Zealand in the 2021 final.

On 12 January 2019, Australia won the first ODI against India at the Sydney Cricket Ground by 34 runs, to record their 1,000th win in international cricket.

History

Early history

The Australian cricket team participated in the first Test match at the MCG in 1877, defeating an English team by 45 runs, with Charles Bannerman making the first Test century, a score of 165 retired hurt. Test cricket, which only occurred between Australia and England at the time, was limited by the long distance between the two countries, which would take several months by sea. Despite Australia's much smaller population, the team was very competitive in early games, producing stars such as Jack Blackham, Billy Murdoch, Fred "The Demon" Spofforth, George Bonnor, Percy McDonnell, George Giffen and Charles "The Terror" Turner. Most cricketers at the time were either from New South Wales or Victoria, with the notable exception of George Giffen, the star South Australian all-rounder.

A highlight of Australia's early history was the 1882 Test match against England at The Oval. In this match, Fred Spofforth took 7/44 in the game's fourth innings to save the match by preventing England from making their 85-run target. After this match The Sporting Times, a major newspaper in London at the time, printed a mock obituary in which the death of English cricket was proclaimed and the announcement made that "the body was cremated and the ashes taken to Australia." This was the start of the famous Ashes series in which Australia and England play a series of Test matches to decide the holder of the Ashes. To this day, the contest is one of the fiercest rivalries in sport.

Golden age

The so-called 'Golden Age' of Australian Test cricket occurred around the end of the 19th century and the beginning of the 20th century with the team under the captaincy of Joe Darling, Monty Noble and Clem Hill winning eight of ten tours. It is considered to have lasted from the 1897–98 English tour of Australia and the 1910–11 South African tour of Australia. Outstanding batsmen such as Joe Darling, Clem Hill, Reggie Duff, Syd Gregory, Warren Bardsley and Victor Trumper, brilliant all-rounders including Monty Noble, George Giffen, Harry Trott and Warwick Armstrong and excellent bowlers including Ernie Jones, Hugh Trumble, Tibby Cotter, Bill Howell, Jack Saunders and Bill Whitty, all helped Australia to become the dominant cricketing nation for most of this period.

Victor Trumper became one of Australia's first sporting heroes, and was widely considered Australia's greatest batsman before Bradman and one of the most popular players. He played a record (at the time) number of Tests at 49 and scored 3163 (another record) runs at a high for the time average of 39.04. His early death in 1915 at the age of 37 from kidney disease caused national mourning. The Wisden Cricketers' Almanack, in its obituary for him, called him Australia's greatest batsman:  "Of all the great Australian batsmen Victor Trumper was by general consent the best and most brilliant."

The years leading up to the start of World War I were marred by conflict between the players, led by Clem Hill, Victor Trumper and Frank Laver, the Australian Board of Control for International Cricket, led by Peter McAlister, who was attempting to gain more control of tours from the players. This led to six leading players (the so-called "Big Six") walking out on the 1912 Triangular Tournament in England, with Australia fielding what was generally considered a second-rate side. This was the last series before the war, and no more cricket was played by Australia for eight years; Tibby Cotter was killed in Palestine during the war.

Inter-war period

Test cricket resumed in the 1920/21 season in Australia with a touring English team captained by Johnny Douglas losing all five Tests to Australia, captained by the "Big Ship" Warwick Armstrong. Several players from before the war, including Warwick Armstrong, Charlie Macartney, Charles Kelleway, Warren Bardsley and the wicket-keeper Sammy Carter, were instrumental in the team's success, as well as new players Herbie Collins, Jack Ryder, Bert Oldfield, the spinner Arthur Mailey and the so-called "twin destroyers" Jack Gregory and Ted McDonald. The team continued its success on the 1921 tour of England, winning three out of the five Tests in Warwick Armstrong's last series. The side was, on the whole, inconsistent in the latter half of the 1920s, losing its first home Ashes series since the 1911–12 season in 1928–29.

Bradman era

The 1930 tour of England heralded a new age of success for the Australian team. The team, led by Bill Woodfull – the "Great Un-bowlable" – featured legends of the game including Bill Ponsford, Stan McCabe, Clarrie Grimmett and the young pair of Archie Jackson and Don Bradman. Bradman was the outstanding batsman of the series, scoring a record 974 runs, including one century, two double centuries and one triple century, a massive score of 334 at Leeds which including 309 runs in a day. Jackson died of tuberculosis at the age of 23 three years later, after playing eight Tests. The team was widely considered unstoppable, winning nine of its next ten Tests.

The 1932–33 England tour of Australia is considered one of the most infamous episodes of cricket, due to the England team's use of bodyline, where captain Douglas Jardine instructed his bowlers Bill Voce and Harold Larwood to bowl fast, short-pitched deliveries aimed at the bodies of the Australian batsmen. The tactic, although effective, was widely considered by Australian crowds as vicious and unsporting. Injuries to Bill Woodfull, who was struck over the heart, and Bert Oldfield, who received a fractured skull (although from a non-bodyline ball), exacerbated the situation, almost causing a full-scale riot from the 50 000 fans at the Adelaide Oval for the third Test. The conflict almost escalated into a diplomatic incident between the two countries, as leading Australian political figures, including the Governor of South Australia, Alexander Hore-Ruthven, protested to their English counterparts. The series ended in a 4–1 win for England but the bodyline tactics used were banned the year after.

The Australian team put the result of this series behind them, winning their next tour of England in 1934. The team was led by Bill Woodfull on his final tour and was notably dominated by Ponsford and Bradman, who twice put on partnerships of over 380 runs, with Bradman once again scoring a triple century at Leeds. The bowling was dominated by the spin pair of Bill O'Reilly and Clarrie Grimmett, who took 53 wickets between them, with O'Reilly twice taking seven-wicket hauls.

Sir Donald Bradman is widely considered the greatest batsman of all time. He dominated the sport from 1930 until his retirement in 1948, setting new records for the highest score in a Test innings (334 vs England at Headingley in 1930), the most runs (6996), the most centuries (29), the most double centuries and the highest Test and first-class batting averages. His record for the highest Test batting average – 99.94 – has never been beaten. It is almost 40 runs per innings above the next highest average. He would have finished with an average of over 100 runs per innings if he had not been dismissed for a duck in his last Test. He was knighted in 1949 for services to cricket. He is generally considered one of Australia's all-time greatest sporting heroes, if not the greatest.

Test cricket was again interrupted by war, with the last Test series in 1938 made notable by Len Hutton scoring a world record 364 for England, and with Chuck Fleetwood-Smith conceding 298 runs in England's world record total of 7/903. Ross Gregory, a notable young batsman who played two Tests before the war, was killed in the war.

Post-war era

The team continued its success after the end of the Second World War with the first Test (also Australia's first against New Zealand) being played in the 1945–46 season against New Zealand. Australia was by far the most successful team of the 1940s, being undefeated throughout the decade, winning two Ashes series against England and its first Test series against India. The team capitalised on its ageing stars Bradman, Sid Barnes, Bill Brown and Lindsay Hassett while new talent, including Ian Johnson, Don Tallon, Arthur Morris, Neil Harvey, Bill Johnston and the fast bowling pair of Ray Lindwall and Keith Miller, who all made their debut in the latter half of the 1940s, and were to form the basis of the team for a good part of the next decade. The team that Don Bradman led to England in 1948 gained the moniker The Invincibles, after going through the tour without losing a single game. Of 31 first-class games played during the tour, they won 23 and drew 8, including winning the five-match Test series 4–0 with one draw. The tour was particularly notable for the fourth Test of the series, in which Australia won by seven wickets chasing a target of 404, setting a new record for the highest run chase in Test cricket, with Arthur Morris and Bradman both scoring centuries, as well as for the final Test in the series, Bradman's last, where he finished with a duck in his last innings after needing only four runs to secure a career average of 100.

Australia was less successful in the 1950s, losing three consecutive Ashes series to England, including a horrendous 1956 Tour of England, where the 'spin twins' Laker and Lock destroyed Australia, taking 61 wickets between them, including Laker taking 19 wickets in the game (a first-class record) at Headingley, a game dubbed Laker's Match.

However, the team rebounded to win five consecutive series in the latter half of the 1950s, first under the leadership of Ian Johnson, then Ian Craig and Richie Benaud. The series against the West Indies in the 1960–61 season was notable for the Tied Test in the first game at the Gabba, which was the first in Test cricket. Australia ended up winning the series 2–1 after a hard-fought series that was praised for its excellent standards and sense of fair play. Stand-out players in that series as well as through the early part of the 1960s were Richie Benaud, who took a then-record number of wickets as a leg-spinner and who also captained Australia in 28 Tests, including 24 without defeat; Alan Davidson, who was a notable fast-bowler and also became the first player to take 10 wickets and make 100 runs in the same game in the first Test; Bob Simpson, who also later captained Australia for two different periods of time; Colin McDonald, the first-choice opening batsman for most of the 1950s and early '60s; Norm O'Neill, who made 181 in the Tied Test; Neil Harvey, towards the end of his long career; and Wally Grout, an excellent wicket-keeper who died at the age of 41.

World Series Cricket and Restructuring
The Centenary Test was played in March 1977 at the MCG to celebrate 100 years since the first Test was played. Australia won the match by 45 runs, an identical result to the first Test match.

In May 1977, Kerry Packer announced he was organising a breakaway competition – World Series Cricket (WSC) – after the Australian Cricket Board (ACB) refused to accept Channel Nine's bid to gain exclusive television rights to Australia's Test matches in 1976. Packer secretly signed leading international cricketers to his competition, including 28 Australians. Almost all of the Australian Test team at the time were signed to WSC – notable exceptions including Gary Cosier, Geoff Dymock, Kim Hughes and Craig Serjeant – and the Australian selectors were forced to pick what was generally considered a third-rate team from players in the Sheffield Shield. Former player Bob Simpson, who had retired 10 years previously after a conflict with the board, was recalled at the age of 41 to captain Australia against India. Jeff Thomson was named deputy in a team that included seven debutants. Australia managed to win the series 3–2, mainly thanks to the batting of Simpson, who scored 539 runs, including two centuries; and the bowling of Wayne Clark, who took 28 wickets. Australia lost the next series 3–1 against the West Indies, which was fielding a full strength team; and also lost the 1978–79 Ashes series 5–1, the team's worst Ashes result in Australia. Graham Yallop was named as captain for the Ashes, with Kim Hughes taking over for the 1979–80 tour of India. Rodney Hogg took 41 wickets in his debut series, an Australian record. WSC players returned to the team for the 1979–80 season after a settlement between the ACB and Kerry Packer. Greg Chappell was reinstated as captain.

The underarm bowling incident of 1981 occurred when, in an ODI against New Zealand, Greg Chappell instructed his brother Trevor to bowl an underarm delivery to New Zealand batsman Brian McKechnie with New Zealand needing a six to tie off the last ball. The aftermath of the incident soured political relations between Australia and New Zealand, with several leading political and cricketing figures calling it "unsportsmanlike" and "not in the spirit of cricket".

Australia continued its success up until the early 1980s, built around the Chappell brothers, Dennis Lillee, Jeff Thomson and Rod Marsh. The 1980s was a period of relative mediocrity after the turmoil caused by the Rebel Tours of South Africa and the subsequent retirement of several key players. The rebel tours were funded by the South African Cricket Board to compete against its national side, which had been banned—along with many other sports, including Olympic athletes—from competing internationally, due to the South African government's racist apartheid policies. Some of Australia's best players were poached: Graham Yallop, Carl Rackemann, Terry Alderman, Rodney Hogg, Kim Hughes, John Dyson, Greg Shipperd, Steve Rixon and Steve Smith amongst others. These players were handed three-year suspensions by the Australian Cricket Board which greatly weakened the player pool for the national sides, as most were either current representative players or on the verge of gaining honours.

Golden era

The so-called 'Golden Era' of Australian cricket occurred around the end of the 20th century and the beginning of the 21st century. This was a period in which Australian cricket recovered from the disruption caused by World Series Cricket to create arguably the strongest Test team in history.

Under the captaincy of Allan Border and the new fielding standards put in place by new coach Bob Simpson, the team was restructured and gradually rebuilt their cricketing stocks. Some of the rebel players returned to the national side after serving their suspensions, including Trevor Hohns, Carl Rackemann and Terry Alderman. During these lean years, it was the batsmen Border, David Boon, Dean Jones, the young Steve Waugh and the bowling feats of Alderman, Bruce Reid, Craig McDermott, Merv Hughes and to a lesser extent, Geoff Lawson who kept the Australian side afloat.

With the emergence of players such as Ian Healy, Mark Taylor, Geoff Marsh, Mark Waugh, and Greg Matthews in the late 1980s, Australia was on the way back from the doldrums. Winning the Ashes in 1989, the Australians got a roll on beating Pakistan, Sri Lanka and then followed it up with another Ashes win on home soil in 1991. The Australians went on to the West Indies and had their chances but ended up losing the series. However, they bounced back and beat the Indians in their next Test series; with the retirement of the champion but defensive Allan Border, a new era of attacking cricket had begun under the leadership of firstly Mark Taylor and then Steve Waugh.

The 1990s and early 21st century were arguably Australia's most successful periods, unbeaten in all Ashes series played bar the famous 2005 series and achieving a hat-trick of World Cups. This success has been attributed to the restructuring of the team and system by Border, successive aggressive captains, and the effectiveness of several key players, most notably Glenn McGrath, Shane Warne, Justin Langer, Matthew Hayden, Steve Waugh, Adam Gilchrist, Michael Hussey and Ricky Ponting.

21st century

Following the 2006–07 Ashes series which Australia won 5 nil, Australia slipped in the rankings after the retirements of key players. In the 2013/14 Ashes series, Australia again defeated England 5 nil and climbed back to third in the ICC International Test rankings. In February/March 2014, Australia beat South Africa, the number 1 team in the world, 2–1 and overtook them to return to the top of the rankings. In 2015, Australia won the World Cup, losing just one game for the tournament.

, Australia are ranked first in the ICC Test Championship, fourth in the ICC ODI Championship and second in the ICC T20I Championship.

2018 ball-tampering incident 

On 25 March 2018, during the third Test match against hosts South Africa; players Cameron Bancroft, Steve Smith, David Warner and the leadership group of the team were implicated in a ball tampering scandal. Smith and Bancroft admitted to conspiring to alter the condition of the ball by rubbing it with a piece of adhesive tape containing abrasive granules picked up from the ground (it was later revealed that sandpaper was used). Smith stated that the purpose was to gain an advantage by unlawfully changing the ball's surface in order to generate reverse swing. Bancroft had been filmed tampering with the ball and, after being informed he had been caught, he was seen to transfer a yellow object from a pocket to the inside front of his trousers to hide the evidence. Steve Smith and David Warner were stood down as captain and vice-captain during the third Test while head coach, Darren Lehmann was suspected to have assisted Cameron Bancroft to tamper the ball. The ICC imposed a one-match ban and 100%-match-fee fine on Smith, while Bancroft was fined 75 percent of his match fee and received 3 demerit points.
Smith and Warner were both stripped of their captaincy roles by Cricket Australia and sent home from the tour (along with Bancroft). Tim Paine was appointed as captain for the fourth Test. Cricket Australia then suspended Smith and Warner from playing for 12 months and Bancroft for 9 months. Smith and Bancroft could not be considered for leadership roles for 12 months after the suspension, while Warner is banned from leadership of any Cricket Australia team for life. In the aftermath of these events, Darren Lehmann announced his resignation as head coach at the end of the series, with Justin Langer replacing him. On 8 May 2018, Tim Paine was also named as the ODI captain while Aaron Finch was reinstated as T20I captain hours later, although Finch replaced Paine as the ODI captain after the 5-0 ODI series whitewash in England in June 2018.

October 2018–present 
On 7 October 2018, Australia played their first Test match under new coach Justin Langer and a new leadership group, which included Tim Paine as Australia's 46th Test captain. After a 1–0 loss to Pakistan in a two match Test series against Pakistan in the UAE and a 2–1 defeat against India in a four match Test series, they found success against Sri Lanka, winning the two Test match series 2–0.

In 2019, Australia played in the Cricket World Cup, where they finished second in the group stage before being knocked out by England at Edgbaston in the semi-final. Australia later went on to retain the Ashes during the 2019 Ashes series, the first time on English soil since 2001, by winning the fourth Test at Old Trafford.

In 2020–21, Australia hosted India for 3 ODIs, 3 T20Is, and 4 Tests. They won the ODI series 2–1, but lost the T20I series 2–1. Then, the two teams competed for the Border-Gavaskar Trophy which saw one of the greatest overseas Test triumphs by India in the 4th Test to win the series 2–1, with the 3rd Test being drawn.

In 2021, Australia named a 15-member squad for the upcoming T20 World Cup with regular limited overs captain Aaron Finch leading the side. Australia were a part of Group 1, a group  including England, West Indies and South Africa. Under Finch's leadership, Australia easily beat South Africa and Sri Lanka by 5 wickets and 7 wickets respectively before suffering an 8-wicket loss to England. After beating Bangladesh and the West Indies, Australia qualified for the semi-finals where they had to face Pakistan, at that point the only unbeaten side in the tournament. Australia won the match to reach the final, where they would face their trans-Tasman rivals New Zealand. After New Zealand scored 172/4 in the first innings, it was up to openers David Warner and captain Finch to get Australia off to a good start. Though Finch departed early, Warner and Mitchell Marsh stitched together a partnership that took the game away from New Zealand; with 66 runs needed from 46 balls, Marsh was joined by Glenn Maxwell, who reverse hit Tim Southee for the winning runs, winning their maiden T20 World Cup with 7 balls to spare.

On 19 November 2021, Tim Paine resigned from the captaincy due to off-the-field misconduct, and was replaced by Pat Cummins, who became Australia's 47th Test captain, with Steve Smith named as his deputy.

International grounds

Australia currently plays International cricket at each of the following grounds:

Team colours
For Test matches, the team wears Cricket Whites, with an optional sweater or sweater-vest, with a green and gold V-neck for use in cold weather. The sponsor's (currently Alinta for home matches and Qantas for away matches) logo is displayed on the right side of the chest while the Cricket Australia emblem is displayed on the left. If the sweater is being worn the Cricket Australia emblem is displayed under the V-neck and the sponsor's logo is again displayed on the right side of the chest. The baggy green, the Australian Test cricket cap, is considered an essential part of the cricketing uniform and as a symbol of the national team, with new players being presented with one upon their selection in the team. The cap and the helmet both prominently display the Australian cricketing coat-of-arms instead of the Cricket Australia emblem. At the end of 2011, ASICS was named the manufacturer of the whites and limited over uniforms from Adidas, with the ASICS logo being displayed on the shirt and pants. Players may choose any manufacturer for their other gear (bat, pads, shoes, gloves, etc.).

In One Day International (ODI) cricket and Twenty20 International cricket, the team wears uniforms usually coloured green and gold, the national colours of Australia. There has been a variety of different styles and layouts used in both forms of the limited-overs game, with coloured clothing (sometimes known as "pyjamas") being introduced for World Series Cricket in the late 1970s. The Alinta or Qantas logo is prominently displayed on the shirts and other gears. The current home ODI kit consists of green as the primary colour and gold as the secondary colour. The away kit is the opposite of the home kit, with gold as the primary colour and green as the secondary colour. The home Twenty20 kit consists of black, with the natural colours of Australia, green and gold strips. However, since Australia beat New Zealand at the MCG in the 2015 Cricket World Cup wearing the gold uniform, it has also become their primary colour, with the hats used being called 'floppy gold', formerly known as 'baggy gold', a limited-overs equivalent to a baggy green. Until the early 2000s and briefly in early 2020, in ODIs, Australia wore yellow helmets, before using green helmets as in test matches.

Former suppliers were Asics (1999), ISC (2000–2001), Fila (2002–2003) and Adidas (2004–2010) among others. Before Travelex (and 3 in test matches), some of the former sponsors were XXXX (1990–1992), Coca-Cola (1993–1998), Fly Emirates (1999) and Carlton & United Breweries (2000–2001).

Squad
Cricket Australia released the list of their 2022-2023 national contracts on 7 April 2022. Players who miss out on the initial contract list can be upgraded during the year by earning selection in national teams. Players need to accrue 12 points to earn a contract, with Tests worth five points, ODIs two points and T20Is one point.

This is a list of every active player who is contracted to Cricket Australia, has played for Australia since January 2022 or was named in the recent Test, ODI or T20I squads. Uncapped players are listed in italics.

Aaron Finch captained and played in ODIs and T20Is in this period but has since announced retirement from international cricket.

Last updated: 20 March 2023

Forms - This refers to the forms they've played for Australia in the past year, not over their whole Australia career
S/N – Shirt number
C – Contracted to Cricket Australia (Y = Holds contract)

Coaching staff

National selection panel

Coaching history

1986–1996:  Bob Simpson
1996–1999:  Geoff Marsh
1999–2007:  John Buchanan
2007–2011:  Tim Nielsen
2010–2013:  Mickey Arthur
2013–2018:  Darren Lehmann
2018–2022:  Justin Langer
2022–present:  Andrew McDonald

Test match records

Team
Australia is the most successful Test team in cricketing history. It has won more than 350 Test matches at a rate of almost 47%. The next best performance is by South Africa at 37%.
Australia have been involved in the only two Tied Tests played. The first occurred in December 1960, against the West Indies in Brisbane. The second occurred in September 1986, against India in Madras (Chennai).
Australia's largest  victory in a Test match came on 24 February 2002. Australia defeated South Africa by an innings and 360 runs in Johannesburg.
Australia holds the record for the most consecutive wins, with 16. This has been achieved twice; from October 1999 to February 2001 and from December 2005 to January 2008.
Australia shares the record for the most consecutive series victories winning 9 series from October 2005 to June 2008. This record is shared, with England.
Australia's highest total in a Test match innings was recorded in Kingston, Jamaica against the West Indies in June 1955. Australia posted 758/8 in their first innings, with five players scoring a century.
Australia's lowest total in a Test match innings was recorded in Birmingham against England in May 1902. Australia were bowled all out for 36.
Australia are the only team to have lost a Test match after enforcing the follow-on, having been the losing side in all three such matches:
The first Test in the 1894–95 Ashes.
The third Test of the 1981 Ashes.
The second Test in the 2000–01 Border-Gavaskar Trophy series against India.
Against India in March 2013, Australia became the first team in Test history to declare in their first innings and then lose by an innings.
In the 2013–14 Ashes series, Australia took all 100 wickets on offer in the 5–0 sweep over England.

Appearances
Ricky Ponting and Steve Waugh have played in the most Test matches for Australia, both playing in 168 matches.

Batting
Charles Bannerman faced the first ball in Test cricket, scored the first runs in Test cricket and also scored the first Test century.
Charles Bannerman also scored 67.34% of the Australian first innings total in match 1. This record remains to this day as the highest percentage of a completed innings total that has been scored by a single batsman.
Ricky Ponting has scored the most runs for Australia in Test cricket, with 13,378 runs. Allan Border is second, with 11,174 runs in 265 innings, a record which was broken by Brian Lara during his innings of 226 against Australia, while Steve Waugh has 10,927 from 260 innings.
Allan Border was the first Australian batsman to pass 10,000 and the first ever batsman to pass 11,000 Test runs.
Ricky Ponting was the first Australian batsman to pass 12,000 and 13,000 Test runs.
Matthew Hayden holds the record for the most runs in a single innings by an Australian, with 380 in the first Test against Zimbabwe in Perth in October 2003.
Donald Bradman holds the record for the highest average by an Australian (or any other) cricketer of 99.94 runs per dismissal. Bradman played 52 Tests, scoring 29 centuries and a further 13 fifties.
Ricky Ponting holds the record for the most centuries by an Australian cricketer, with 41. Former Australian captain Steve Waugh is in second position, with 32 centuries from 260 innings.
Allan Border holds the record for the most fifties by an Australian cricketer, with 63 in 265 innings.
Adam Gilchrist holds the record for the fastest century by an Australian.
Glenn McGrath holds the record for the most ducks by an Australian cricketer, with 35 in 138 innings.

Bowling
Billy Midwinter picked up the first five-wicket haul in a Test innings in match 1.
Fred Spofforth performed Test cricket's first hat-trick by dismissing Vernon Royle, Francis McKinnon and Tom Emmett in successive balls.
Fred Spofforth also took the first 10-wicket match haul in Test cricket.
Shane Warne holds the record for the most wickets by an Australian cricketer, with 708 wickets in 145 Test matches.
Arthur Mailey holds the record for the best bowling figures in an innings by an Australian cricketer, with 9/121 against England in February 1921.
Bob Massie holds the record for the best bowling figures in a match by an Australian cricketer, with 16/137 against England in June 1972. That was also his first Test match for Australia.
J. J. Ferris holds the record for the best bowling average by an Australian bowler, taking 61 wickets at 12.70 in his career.
Clarrie Grimmett holds the record for the most wickets in a Test series, with 44 against South Africa in 1935–36.

Fielding and wicketkeeping
Ricky Ponting holds the record for the most catches in a career by an Australian fielder, with 196 in 168 matches.
Jack Blackham performed the first stumping in Test cricket in match 1.
Adam Gilchrist holds the record for the most dismissals in a career by an Australian wicketkeeper, with 416 in 96 matches.

One-Day International records

Team
Australia's highest total in a One-Day International innings is 434/4, scored off 50 overs against South Africa in Johannesburg on 12 March 2006. This was a world record score before the South Africans later surpassed it in the same match.
Australia's lowest total in a One-Day International innings is 70. This score has occurred twice; once against England in 1977 and once against New Zealand in 1986.
Australia's largest victory in One-Day International cricket is 275 runs. This occurred against Afghanistan at the 2015 World Cup in Australia.
Australia are the only team in the history of the World Cup to win 3 consecutive tournaments; 1999, 2003 and 2007.
Australia went undefeated at the World Cup for a record 34 consecutive matches. After being defeated by Pakistan in 1999, Australia would remain unbeaten until they were again defeated by Pakistan in 2011.
Australia have won the most World Cups – 5.

Appearances
Ricky Ponting has played in the most One-Day International matches for Australia, playing 375 matches.

Batting
Ricky Ponting has the most One-Day International runs by an Australian batsman, with 13,291.
Ricky Ponting has the most One-Day International centuries by an Australian batsman, with 30.
Ricky Ponting has the most One-Day International fifties by an Australian batsman, with 82.
Ricky Ponting is the first Australian batsman to pass 10,000 One-Day International runs.
Shane Watson has the highest individual not out score in an innings by an Australian batsman, with 185*.
Shane Watson has hit the most sixes in a single innings by an Australian player, with 15.
Phillip Hughes was the only Australian player to score a century on debut in One-Day International cricket.

Bowling
Glenn McGrath has the most One-Day International wickets by an Australian bowler, with 381.
Glenn McGrath has the best bowling figures by an Australian bowler, with 7/15.
Brett Lee has the most five-wicket hauls by an Australian bowler, with 9.

Fielding and wicketkeeping
Ricky Ponting has the most catches taken by an Australian fielder, with 154.
Adam Gilchrist has the most dismissals by an Australian wicketkeeper, with 470.
Adam Gilchrist has the most catches taken by an Australian wicketkeeper, with 416.
Adam Gilchrist has the most stumpings made by an Australian wicketkeeper, with 54.

Twenty20 International records

Tournament history
A red box around the year indicates tournaments played within Australia

ICC World Test Championship

ICC World Cup

ICC T20 World Cup

ICC Champions Trophy

Commonwealth Games

Honours

ICC
World Cup:
 Champions (5): 1987, 1999, 2003, 2007, 2015
 Runners-up (2): 1975, 1996
T20 World Cup:
 Champions (1): 2021
 Runners-up (1): 2010
Champions Trophy:
 Champions (2): 2006, 2009

Others
Commonwealth Games:
 Silver medal (1): 1998

Under the Southern Cross I Stand

The team song is "Under the Southern Cross I Stand", which is sung by the players after every victory and "treated with reverential consideration and respect" within the team. The official lyrics are as follows, though when it is sung by the players, the word "little" in the last line is instead replaced by "bloody" or the expletive "fucking".

Under the Southern Cross I Stand
A sprig of wattle in my hand,
A native of my native land,
Australia you little beauty.

The authorship of this "Under the Southern Cross I Stand" is credited to former wicketkeeper Rod Marsh, who was apparently inspired by Henry Lawson's 1887 poem, "Flag of the Southern Cross". Marsh initially had the role of leading the team in singing it and, on his retirement, passed it on to Allan Border. The other players to have taken on the role are David Boon (when Border took over the captaincy), Ian Healy (on Boon's retirement), Ricky Ponting (on Healy's retirement), Justin Langer (when Ponting took over the captaincy). The role was then passed on to Michael Hussey, who took it on when Langer retired in January 2007. Following Hussey's retirement on 6 January 2013, he announced that he would be handing the duties over to Nathan Lyon.

See also

Allan Border Medal
Australia A cricket team
Australia national women's cricket team
Australian Cricket Hall of Fame
List of Australia national cricket captains
List of Australia ODI cricketers
List of Australia Test cricketers
List of Australia Test wicket-keepers
List of Australia Twenty20 International cricketers

References

Further reading
Townsend, Stephen; Osmond, Gary; Phillips, Murray G. "Wicked Wikipedia? Communities of Practice, the Production of Knowledge and Australian Sports History." International Journal of the History of Sport (2013) 30#5 pp 545–559. How Wikipedia covers Australian cricket.

External links

 

1877 establishments in Australia
Australia in international cricket
Cricket in Australia
Cricket teams in Australia
Laureus World Sports Awards winners
Cricket
National cricket teams
Cricket clubs established in 1877